The  Helmet of Agighiol  is a Getae silver helmet dating from the 4th century BC, housed in the National Museum of Romanian History, Bucharest.

It  comes from Agighiol area, in the  Tulcea County, Romania.

The helmet is similar to the Helmet of Coţofeneşti and other three Getian gold or silver helmets discovered so far.

See also 
 Getae

External links 

4th-century BC works
Military history of Dacia
Archaeological discoveries in Romania
Ancient helmets
Dacian culture
Thracian archaeological artifacts
4th century BC in Romania
Individual helmets